David Abraham Adler (born April 10, 1947) is an American writer of 265 books for children and young adults, most notably the Cam Jansen mystery series, the "Picture Book of..." series, and several acclaimed works about the Holocaust for young readers.

Biography
Adler was born in New York. He graduated from Queens College in 1968 with a bachelor's degree in economics and education. For the next nine years, he worked as a mathematics teacher for the New York City Board of Education, while taking classes towards a master's degree in marketing, a degree he was awarded by New York University in 1971. In that same year, a question from his then-three-year-old nephew inspired Adler to write his first story, A Little at a Time, subsequently published by Random House in 1976. Adler's next project, a series of math books, drew on his experience as a math teacher. In 1977, he created his most famous character, Cam Jansen, originally featured in Cam Jansen and the Mystery of the Stolen Diamonds, which was first published in 1980 and is still in print along with more than 50 other Cam Jansen Mysteries.  Worldwide, more than 30,000,000 Cams have been printed and sold.

Adler married psychologist Renee Hamada in 1973, and their first child, Michael, was born in 1977. By that time Adler had taken a break from teaching and, while his wife continued her work, he stayed home, took care of Michael, and began a full-time writing career.

Adler's son, Michael S. Adler, is now the co-author of several books with his father, including A Picture Book of Sam Adams, A Picture Book of John Hancock, and A Picture Book of James and Dolly Madison. Another son, Edward, was the inspiration for Adler's Andy Russell series, with the events described in the series loosely based on adventures the Adler family had with Edward's enthusiasm and his pets.

In January 2016, Adler (together with illustrator Sam Ricks) won the prestigious Theodor Seuss Geisel award for the 2015 book Don't Throw It To Mo!

David on David 
"I am the second of six children, all very close in age. My parents encouraged each of us to be an individual. It was their way of lessening the competition between us. As a child, I was known as a family artist. Paintings and drawings I did when I was as young as twelve still hang in my parents' home. And I was creative. I drew funny signs that I taped around the house. I also made up stories to entertain my younger brothers and sisters. One sister's favorite story was about the girl who planted flowers in her shoes. I'm still making up stories.
“We lived in a large house with a whole unused third floor, unused except for storage for our extended family. For thirty years my parents kept in an otherwise unused room unwanted wedding gifts belonging to a relative who had moved overseas -- an electric fan, dishes with a strange bird pattern, luggage, pots, and lots of cups and glasses. When the relative returned to the states, he was surprised my parents had kept all that, and he and his wife still didn't want all those gifts. But what a wonderful room to crawl between the boxes and suitcases and imagine all the stories I could tell!
"I never thought I would become a writer. I graduated college in 1968 with a license to teach history and math. I taught math in the New York City school system for nine years, and I went to graduate school. I also drew cartoons. I even sold a few.
"In 1971 my three-year-old nephew came to my house and asked me a question. And he kept asking questions. When he left, I had all those questions swirling in my head and that led to my very first published story, A Little At A Time. I sent it to Random House, my first story and my first submission, and after six months of consideration, it was accepted for publication. The editor was impressed at how I had captured the voice of a young child in all my questions. That was easy! I just listened, remembered, and wrote. Then, as a math teacher, I wrote a few math books for Thomas Y. Crowell, now a division of HarperCollins. In 1973 I married and in 1977 our first son was born. I was granted a child-care leave from teaching and while I was caring for my infant son, I created Cam Jansen. Happily, those books led to many others.
“For me, writing is a process. I begin with a story idea, with the main characters, and the setting. I struggle most with the “voice,” – how I will tell the story. For me, writing involves constant revisions. It's so much easier, I think, not to try and get the story just right in the first draft, to leave that for the second and third drafts. My best stories have been rewritten scores of times.”

As of September 2016, Adler has three sons and five grandsons. He lives in Woodmere, New York.

Adler has won many awards including the Knickerbocker Award for his body of work, the 2017 Regina Medal for his body of work from the  Catholic Library Association, the California Young Readers' Medal for his book "The Babe and I," The 2006 Storytelling World Award for "Joe Louis: America's Fighter," the 2006 Children's Gallery Award for "Mama Played Baseball," The Boston Globe-Horn Book Honor for "Lou Gehrig: The Luckiest Man," and The Sydney Taylor ALJ Award for "The Number on My Grandfather's Arm."    Regina Award in 2017 and the Orthodox Jewish All-Star Award also in 2017.

Menucha Classroom Solutions, an imprint of Menucha Publishers has published new titles by Adler in 2018 with new titles forthcoming later in the year.

Books

Cam Jansen mystery series
A series of books following the exploits of a fifth-grade female detective named Jennifer "Cam" Jansen and her best friend Eric. Nicknamed Cam for her photographic memory, the protagonist closes her eyes and says "click" at various points in a story, mimicking the noise of a camera while memorizing a scene in front of her. She later recalls these scenes to aid in solving a mystery. The Cam Jansen character was based on an elementary school classmate of Adler's who was believed to have a photographic memory.

A stage musical based on the character Cam Jansen and novels was produced by Theatreworks USA Off-Broadway in 2004. The musical has music by Laurence O'Keefe and lyrics and a book by Nell Benjamin.

Young Cam Jansen series

Holocaust books for young readers
 The Number on My Grandfather's Arm (1987)
 We Remember the Holocaust (1989)
 A Picture Book of Anne Frank (1993)
 Hilde and Eli: Children of the Holocaust (1994)
 One Yellow Daffodil: A Hanukkah Story (1995)
 Child of the Warsaw Ghetto (1995)
 Hiding from the Nazis (1997)
 A Hero and the Holocaust: The Story of Janusz Korczak and His Children (2003)

Bones mystery series
 Bones and the Big Yellow Mystery (2004)
 Bones and the Dog Gone Mystery (2004)
 Bones and the Cupcake Mystery (2005)
 Bones and the Dinosaur Mystery (2005)
 Bones and the Birthday Mystery (2007)
 Bones and the Math Test Mystery (2008)
 Bones and the Roller Coaster Mystery (2009)
 Bones and the Clown Mix-Up Mystery (2010)
 Bones and the Football Mystery (2012)

Andy Russell series
 The Many Troubles of Andy Russell (1998)
 Andy and Tamika (1999)
 School Trouble for Andy Russell (1999)
 Parachuting Hamsters and Andy Russell (2000)
 Andy Russell, Not Wanted By the Police (2001)
 It's a Baby, Andy Russell (2005)

Biographies (including the "Picture Book of ...")

Other series
 The Fourth Floor Twins series
 A Houdini Club Mystery series
 Jeffrey's Ghost series
 Jelly Eli Z. series
 Mo Jackson series
 My Dog mystery series
 T.F. Benson mystery series

Other

See also

References

External links
 
 The official Cam Jansen website
 David A. Adler Papers, Special Collections at the University of Southern Mississippi (de Grummond Children's Literature Collection)

1947 births
 Living people
 American children's writers
 Jewish American writers
 Queens College, City University of New York alumni
 New York University Stern School of Business alumni
 People from Woodmere, New York
21st-century American Jews